Alison Kellow  is a botanist and research scientist from Australia, and a lecturer at La Trobe University.

Kellow completed a Bachelor of Science degree at the University of Melbourne, and postgraduate studies in environmental science at Monash University. She completed her doctoral degree in Natural Resource Sciences at the University of Adelaide.

Kellow is the joint author, with Michael Bayly, of An Illustrated Guide to New Zealand Hebes, which was a finalist in the 2007 Montana New Zealand Book Awards. The pair worked on the project while both were researchers for the Museum of New Zealand Te Papa Tongarewa. Kellow also held a position at Industrial Research Ltd, working on flavonoid chemistry.

References

Living people
21st-century Australian botanists
University of Melbourne alumni
Monash University alumni
University of Adelaide alumni
Academic staff of La Trobe University
Year of birth missing (living people)
21st-century Australian women scientists